King's Bishop (1969–1981) was an American Thoroughbred racehorse.

Background
King's Bishop was a bay horse bred in Kentucky by Warner L. Jones, Jr. He was sired by U.S. Racing Hall of Fame inductee Round Table. He was out of the mare Spearfish, a descendant of Nearco.

King's Bishop was owned by Craig F. Cullinan Jr., founding president of the Houston Astros Major League Baseball club, who purchased him as a yearling at the Keeneland Sales for $72,000.

Racing career
Cullinan raced King's Bishop through 1972, then sold him to Allaire du Pont. She raced him in 1973 under the nom de course Bohemia Stable. King's Bishop won several important Graded stakes races and on May 19, 1973 he set a Belmont Park track record of 1:20 2/5 for seven furlongs in winning the Carter Handicap. King's Bishop retired from racing with a record of eleven wins in twenty-eight starts.

In 1984 Saratoga Race Course created the King's Bishop Stakes in his memory. In 2017, the race was renamed to honor U.S. Racing Hall of Fame trainer H. Allen Jerkens.

Pedigree

References

1969 racehorse births
1981 racehorse deaths
Racehorses bred in Kentucky
Racehorses trained in the United States
Horse racing track record setters
Thoroughbred family 11
Chefs-de-Race